Jobellisia is a genus of fungi within the family Jobiellaceae, class Sordariomycetes. The genus was circumscribed by Margaret Elizabeth Barr-Bigelow in 1993 with J. luteola as the type species. It contains species that grow on dead wood and bark in tropical and temperate regions of the Northern Hemisphere.

Barr originally classified Jobellisia in the family Clypeosphaeriaceae of the order Xylariales. Later phylogenetic work showed that J. luteola and J. fraterna formed a clade that is sister to the order Diaporthales. In 2008, Martina Réblová erected a new genus, Bellojisia (an anagram of Jobellisia), to contain what was then called Jobellisia rhynchostoma, and created the family Jobiellaceae for the remaining Jobellisia species. She demonstrated that Jobiellaceae occupies a basal position in a clade containing the Calosphaeriales and Diaporthales.

References

Sordariomycetes genera
Sordariomycetes enigmatic taxa